Bryan Sandlin is an American politician. He serves as a Republican member for the 15th district, Position 2 in the Washington House of Representatives.

References 

Living people
Place of birth missing (living people)
Year of birth missing (living people)
Republican Party members of the Washington House of Representatives
21st-century American politicians
Washington State University alumni